The Willie Mays World Series Most Valuable Player (MVP) Award is given to the Major League Baseball (MLB) player deemed to have the most impact on his team's performance in the World Series, which is the final round of the MLB postseason. The award was first presented in 1955 as the SPORT Magazine Award, but is now decided during the final game of the Series by a committee of reporters and officials present at the game. On September 29, 2017, it was renamed in honor of Willie Mays in remembrance of the 63rd anniversary of The Catch, which occurred the year prior to the award's debut; Mays never won the award himself.

Pitchers have been named Series MVP twenty-nine (29) times; four of them were relief pitchers. Twelve of the first fourteen World Series MVPs were won by pitchers; from 1969 until 1986, the proportion of pitcher MVPs declined—Rollie Fingers (1974) and Bret Saberhagen (1985) were the only two pitchers to win the award in this period. From 1987 until 1991, all of the World Series MVPs were pitchers, and, since 1995, pitchers have won the award nine times. Bobby Richardson of the 1960 New York Yankees is the only player in World Series history to be named MVP despite being on the losing team. Stephen Strasburg (2019 winner), is the only first overall draft pick to win the award.

Trophy
The World Series MVP award up to 2017 was a trophy that was similar to the Commissioner's Trophy, albeit scaled down and with a single large gold-plated flag.

After being renamed to Willie Mays World Series MVP Award for the 2018 edition and onward, the trophy is a wooden pedestal topped by a bronze sculpture of Willie Mays making the iconic catch in the 1954 World Series.

General Motors has provided a vehicle to the World Series MVP winner for 14 straight seasons through 2018. Since 2019, Disney Parks, Products and Experiences has sponsored the award.

Winners

By team

By position

 Pitching total includes both starting and relief roles.

Multiple winners

See also

 Babe Ruth Award
 List of Major League Baseball awards
 Baseball awards#United States

Notes
 Johnny Podres won the inaugural award in 1955 with the Brooklyn Dodgers. Podres, with nine wins and ten losses during the regular season, beat the Yankees twice in the series; both victories were complete games. 
 Don Larsen won the 1956 World Series MVP after pitching the only no-hitter in World Series history, in the fifth game of the series; the no-hitter was also a perfect game.
 Bobby Richardson won the 1960 World Series MVP while playing for the losing team in the series, the New York Yankees, and had 12 runs batted in, a World Series record; he is also the only second baseman to win the World Series MVP. 
 In 1977, Reggie Jackson hit three home runs in the deciding game, taking the nickname "Mr. October", in which October is the month of the MLB postseason; Jackson had a total of five home runs in the series, a World Series record.
 Willie Stargell won the 1979 World Series MVP at the age of 39, and is the oldest World Series MVP. 
 In 1996, John Wetteland won the World Series MVP, setting a World Series record with four saves.
 In 2000, Derek Jeter won the World Series MVP and the All-Star Game MVP in the same season, the only player to do so.
 22 World Series MVPs have been inducted into the Baseball Hall of Fame: Alan Trammell (1984), Jack Morris (1991), Paul Molitor (1993), Tom Glavine (1995), Mariano Rivera (1999), Derek Jeter (2000), Randy Johnson (2001), and David Ortiz (2013) are the only Hall of Famers to have won the World Series MVP since 1981. Molitor was also the first designated hitter to win the World Series MVP. 
 Hideki Matsui, the 2009 winner, batted in six runs in the sixth game of the 2009 World Series, tying Richardson's record of most runs batted in for a single World Series game. Matsui became the first Japanese-born player to win the award, as well as the first player to win it as a full-time designated hitter. He is also the only player named both a World Series and a Japan Series MVP.

 Three players have won the award twice: Sandy Koufax (1963, 1965), Gibson (1964, 1967), and Jackson (1973, 1977); Jackson is the only player to have won the award with two different teams. There have been two occasions on which multiple winners were awarded in the same World Series: Ron Cey, Pedro Guerrero, and Steve Yeager in 1981, and Johnson and Schilling in 2001. The duo of Johnson and Schilling combined for all four of Arizona's wins in the 2001 World Series; Johnson had three of them.
 Twelve of the fifty-eight World Series MVPs have also won the MLB MVP, the Cy Young Award, or the LCS MVP in the same season. Koufax (1963), Frank Robinson (1966), Jackson (1973), Stargell, and Mike Schmidt (1980) are the only players to have won the MLB MVP and the World Series MVP. A total of six players won the Cy Young Award and the World Series MVP in the same season: Bob Turley (1958), Whitey Ford (1961), Koufax (1963, 1965), Bret Saberhagen (1985), Orel Hershiser (1988), and Johnson (2001). Nine players have won the World Series MVP in the same season in which they won the LCS MVP: Stargell (1979), Darrell Porter (1982), Hershiser (1988), Liván Hernández (1997), Cole Hamels (2008), David Freese (2011), Madison Bumgarner (2014), Corey Seager (2020), and Jeremy Peña (2022)—all of them except Peña were the NLCS MVPs. Koufax (1963) is the only person to have won the Cy Young Award, the MLB MVP, and the World Series MVP in the same season, while Stargell (1979) is the only person to have won the MLB MVP, the LCS MVP, and the World Series MVP in the same season. Hershiser (1988) won the Cy Young Award, the LCS MVP, and the World Series MVP in the same season.
In the 4th inning of the 2015 All-Star Game, 2014 World Series MVP Madison Bumgarner pitched to future 2015 World Series MVP Salvador Pérez, who struck out but reached first due to a passed ball. This was the first time the previous year's MVP faced the current year's future MVP in the All-Star Game. Bumgarner and Pérez also faced each other in the final play of the 2014 World Series: Pérez popped out.

References
General

Specific

 
Most Valuable Player Award
Most Valuable Player Award
Major League Baseball trophies and awards
Major League Baseball most valuable player awards
Major League Baseball
Major League Baseball
Awards established in 1955
1955 establishments in the United States